Walter Farquhar Hook (13 March 1798 – 20 October 1875), known to his contemporaries as Dr Hook, was an eminent Victorian churchman.

He was the Vicar of Leeds responsible for the construction of the current Leeds Minster and for many ecclesiastical and social improvements to the city in the mid-nineteenth century. His achievements, as a High Churchman and Tractarian in a non-conformist city are remarkable. Later in life he became Dean of Chichester.

Biography

Early life
Hook was born the son of James Hook, FRS and his wife Anne Farquhar, daughter of Sir Walter Farquhar MD, in London on 13 March 1798, and educated first at Blundell's School in Tiverton, Devon, then Winchester College, and Christ Church, Oxford, where he graduated in 1821. He obtained his MA in 1824, and his BD and DD in 1837. On taking Holy Orders in 1822, he served first as a curate at his father's church, St Mildred's Church, Whippingham on the Isle of Wight, later as vicar at St Mary's Church, Moseley, Birmingham, and, in 1828, vicar of the Holy Trinity Church, Coventry. He married Anna Delicia, (1811 – 5 April 1871) daughter of Dr John Johnstone of Birmingham on 4 June 1829 and they had several children.

Leeds
His support for the ideals of the Tractarians exposed him to considerable criticism, but his "simple manly character and zealous devotion to parochial work gained him the support of widely divergent classes", according to the 1911 Encyclopædia Britannica.

Leeds invited him to be its Vicar in 1837. The city was expanding as one of the seats of the early industrial revolution, in which non-conformists played a large part. The established church in the city was a minority denomination and dissenters were even elected as churchwardens. In 1842 the elections produced a slate of Chartist churchwardens. 

Hook rebuilt his church, using the church rate levied by the city authorities; this was in the face of objections from non-conformists. He went on to drive through the division of Leeds into 21 parishes, each with its own church. He accepted a reduction in his income and moved to a smaller parsonage, under a deal meaning that ground-floor seats of parish churches in Leeds were bought by the Ecclesiastical Commissioners, rather than allowing pew rentals

Hook fostered the building and support of some 30 schools. His interest in the education of children was contentious at the time, before the Education Acts of the late nineteenth century. His insistence on the necessity of education, and the duty of society to provide it, to some extent, was not what some of his richest parishioners believed.

The minster remains as a physical legacy of Hook's work, being a significant early High Church Gothic revival  design.

Chichester
Hook left Leeds to take up the Deanery of Chichester in 1859. He was appointed  honorary chaplain of the Chichester-based 1st Administrative Battalion, Sussex Rifle Volunteer Corps, on 13 August 1864. He died 20 October 1875 and was buried in Mid Lavant, a small village near Chichester.

Honours

He was elected a Fellow of the Royal Society in 1862 as someone "Eminent as a Divine. Author of the Lives of the Arch-bishops of Canterbury, of The Ecclesiastical Biography, Church Dictionary & several other works."

A memorial to Hook was built in the Leeds Parish Church, and in 1903 a statue was erected to him in City Square, in the company of a select few other leading fathers of the city.  What is now All Souls' Church, Blackman Lane in Leeds was built by public subscription as the Hook Memorial.

Writings
1842: Church Dictionary (often reprinted)
1845: Dictionary of Ecclesiastical Biography. 8 vols. 1845–1852
1860: Lives of the Archbishops of Canterbury. 12 vols. 1860–1876

References

Sources 
 Leodis: Leeds
 Stephens, W. R. W. (1878) The Life and Letters of Walter Farquhar Hook. 2 vols. London: Richard Bentley & Son
 Obituary of Dean Hook, The Times, Thursday, 21 October 1875; p. 8; Issue 28452; col F

Further reading
Stranks, C. J. (1954) Dean Hook. London: A. R. Mowbray
Harry Dalton Anglican Resurgence under W.F.Hook in Early Victorian Leeds

External links 
 
 Bibliographic directory from Project Canterbury
 The Life and Letters of Walter Farquhar Hook, 1878 book from Windows Live Search Books
 Leeds Parish Church

1798 births
1875 deaths
Clergy from London
People educated at Blundell's School
People educated at Winchester College
Alumni of Christ Church, Oxford
English Anglo-Catholics
Members of the Canterbury Association
Deans of Chichester
Fellows of the Royal Society
Anglo-Catholic clergy
19th-century English Anglican priests
Anglo-Catholic writers
19th-century Anglican theologians
18th-century Anglican theologians
18th-century Anglican clergy
19th-century Anglican clergy
18th-century Anglican priests
Sacramental theology